Adams County is a county located in the U.S. state of Colorado. As of the 2020 census, the population was 519,572. The county seat is Brighton. The county is named for Alva Adams, an early Governor of the State of Colorado in 1887–1889. Adams County is part of the Denver–Aurora–Lakewood, CO Metropolitan Statistical Area.

History
On May 30, 1854, the Kansas–Nebraska Act created the Territory of Nebraska and Territory of Kansas, divided by the Parallel 40° North (168th Avenue in present-day Adams County). The future Adams County, Colorado, occupied a strip of northern Arapahoe County, Kansas Territory, immediately south of the Nebraska Territory.

In 1859, John D. "Colonel Jack" Henderson built a ranch, trading post, and hotel on Henderson Island in the South Platte River in Arapahoe County, Kansas Territory. Jack Henderson was the former editor and proprietor of the Leavenworth (Kansas Territory) Journal and an outspoken pro-slavery politician who had been accused of vote fraud in eastern Kansas. Henderson sold meat and provisions to gold seekers on their way up the South Platte River Trail to the gold fields during the Pike's Peak Gold Rush. Henderson Island was the first permanent settlement in the South Platte River Valley between Fort Saint Vrain in the Nebraska Territory and the Cherry Creek Diggings in the Kansas Territory. Jack Henderson eventually returned to eastern Kansas and fought for the Union in the American Civil War. Henderson Island is today the site of the Adams County Regional Park and Fairgrounds.

The eastern portion of the Kansas Territory was admitted to the Union as the State of Kansas on January 29, 1861, and on February 28, 1861, the remaining western portion of the territory was made part of the new Colorado Territory. The Colorado Territory created Arapahoe County, on November 1, 1861, and Colorado was admitted to the Union on August 1, 1876.

In 1901, the Colorado General Assembly voted to split Arapahoe County into three parts: a new Adams County, a new consolidated City and County of Denver, and the remainder of the Arapahoe County to be renamed South Arapahoe County. A ruling by the Colorado Supreme Court, subsequent legislation, and a referendum delayed the creation of Adams County until November 15, 1902. Governor James Bradley Orman designated Brighton as the temporary Adams County Seat. Adams County originally stretched  from present-day Sheridan Boulevard to the Kansas state border. On May 12, 1903, the eastern  of Adams County was transferred to the new Washington County and the new Yuma County, reducing the length of Adams County to the present . On November 8, 1904, Adams County voters chose Brighton as the permanent county seat.

A 1989 vote transferred  of Adams County to the City and County of Denver for the proposed Denver International Airport, leaving the densely populated western portion of the county as two oddly-shaped peninsulas. Adams County lost the tip of its northwest corner when the consolidated City and County of Broomfield was created on November 15, 2001.

Geography

Adams County surrounds (and surrendered the land for) most of Denver International Airport which are in the City and County of Denver.

Adjacent counties
 Weld County – north
 Morgan County – northeast
 Washington County – east
 Arapahoe County – south
 City & County of Denver – southeast
 Jefferson County – west
 City & County of Broomfield – northwest

Major Highways
  Interstate 25
  Interstate 70
  Interstate 76
  Interstate 225

  U.S. Highway 6
  U.S. Highway 36
  U.S. Highway 40
  U.S. Highway 85
  U.S. Highway 87
  State Highway 2
  State Highway 7
  State Highway 36
  State Highway 40
  State Highway 44
  State Highway 79
  State Highway 128
  State Highway 224
  State Highway 265
E-470 (tollway)

National protected area
 Rocky Mountain Arsenal National Wildlife Refuge

State park
 Barr Lake State Park

Historic trail
 South Platte Trail

Recreational trails
 American Discovery Trail
 Big Dry Creek National Recreation Trail
 Highline Canal National Recreation Trail
 Platte River Greenway National Recreation Trail
 Rocky Mountain Arsenal National Recreation Trail

Demographics

As of the census of 2000, there were 363,857 people, 128,156 households, and 92,144 families residing in the county. The population density was 305 people per square mile (118/km2). There were 132,594 housing units at an average density of 111 per square mile (43/km2). The racial makeup of the county was 77.29% White, 2.97% Black or African American, 1.19% Native American, 3.21% Asian, 0.12% Pacific Islander, 11.73% from other races, and 3.49% from two or more races. 28.19% of the population were Hispanic or Latino of any race.

There were 128,156 households, out of which 37.80% had children under the age of 18 living with them, 53.80% were married couples living together, 12.10% had a female householder with no husband present, and 28.10% were non-families. 21.20% of all households were made up of individuals, and 5.50% had someone who was 65 years of age or older living alone. The average household size was 2.81 and the average family size was 3.27.

In the county, the population was spread out, with 28.60% under the age of 18, 10.30% from 18 to 24, 34.00% from 25 to 44, 19.40% from 45 to 64, and 7.80% who were 65 years of age or older. The median age was 31 years. For every 100 females, there were 102.80 males. For every 100 females age 18 and over, there were 102.10 males.

The median income for a household in the county was $47,323, and the median income for a family was $52,517. Males had a median income of $36,499 versus $28,053 for females. The per capita income for the county was $19,944. About 6.50% of families and 8.90% of the population were below the poverty line, including 10.90% of those under age 18 and 7.30% of those age 65 or over.

In 2000, the largest denominational groups were Catholics (with 60,429 members) and Evangelical Protestants (with 25,552 members). The largest religious bodies were the Catholic Church (with 60,429 adherents) and the Church of Jesus Christ of Latter-day Saints (with 6,808 adherents).

Politics
Adams County is predominately Democratic, not having voted Republican since Ronald Reagan in 1984. In 2016, Hillary Clinton won the county without a majority, becoming the first Democrat to do so since her husband Bill Clinton in 1992. In the 2020 election, Joe Biden easily won the county with a majority of the vote, a percentage similar to Barack Obama in 2012 and 2008 but with a much larger vote count.

Education

The school districts serving Adams County are:
 Adams 12 Five Star Schools
 Adams-Arapahoe School District 28J
 Adams County School District 14
 Bennett School District 29-J
 Byers School District 32J
 Deer Trail School District 26J
 Mapleton School District 1
 School District 27J
 Strasburg School District 31J
 Weld County School District RE-3J
 Westminster Public School District
 Wiggins School District RE-50J

Communities

Cities

 Arvada (part)
 Aurora (part)
 Brighton (part)
 Commerce City
 Federal Heights
 Northglenn (part)
 Thornton (most)
 Westminster (part)

Town
 Bennett (part)
 Lochbuie (part)

Census-designated places

 Berkley
 Derby
 North Washington
 Shaw Heights
 Sherrelwood
 Strasburg (mostly in Arapahoe Co.)
 Todd Creek
 Twin Lakes
 Watkins (mostly in Arapahoe Co.)
 Welby

Other unincorporated communities
 Adams City
 Barr Lake
 Cabin Creek
 Comanche
 Dupont
 Eastlake
 Hazeltine
 Henderson
 Leader
 Living Springs
 Manila

License plate code
Up until 1999 when Colorado ceased coding license plates by county, Adams County used the following codes on license plates issued to passenger vehicles: TE-UF, GA-GG, SAA-SEW, and SEY-TZZ.

In popular culture
Adams County was featured as the fictional rival of South Park's peewee hockey team in the South Park episode "Stanley's Cup".

See also

 Outline of Colorado
 Index of Colorado-related articles
 Colorado census statistical areas
 Colorado counties
 Denver-Aurora-Boulder Combined Statistical Area
 Front Range Urban Corridor
 Arapahoe County, Kansas Territory
 Arrappahoe County, Jefferson Territory
 Arapahoe County, Colorado Territory
 National Register of Historic Places listings in Adams County, Colorado

References

External links
 Adams County Government website
 History of Adams County, Colorado
 Adams County Community Development
 Adams County Education Consortium
 Adams County Economic Development 

 
Colorado counties
1901 establishments in Colorado
Eastern Plains
Populated places established in 1901